ANAPROF 2006 is the 2006 season of the Panamanian football (soccer) league, ANAPROF.  The season (officially "Torneo Apertura 2007") started on February 3, 2006 with the "Torneo Apertura 2006" and finalized on November 25, 2006 with the Torneo Clausura 2006. The Apertura champion was San Francisco F.C. and the Clausura champion was Tauro F.C., on December 3, 2006 the ANAPROF 2006 final was played and San Francisco was crowned champion over Tauro.

Change for 2006
Chorrillo F.C. were renamed Municipal Chorrillo before the start of this season.

Teams

Apertura 2006

Standings

Results table

Final round

Semifinals 1st Leg

Semifinals 2nd Leg

Final

Clausura 2006

Standings

Results table

Final round

Semifinals 1st Leg

Semifinals 2nd Leg

Final

Grand Final

Final

Relegation table

Local derby statistics

El Super Clasico Nacional - Tauro v Plaza Amador

Clasico del Pueblo - Plaza Amador v Chorillo

Derbi Interiorano - Atlético Chiriquí v Atlético Veragüense

ANAPROF seasons
1
Pan
1
Pan